(born 1 March 1972 in Kobe, Hyogo) is a Japanese senryū poet, a graduate of Otemae University.

Bibliography
 平凡な兎 ("Ordinary Rabbit"), 2001, 
 やすみりえのとっておき川柳道場 ("Senryu Dojo reserve: Fun begins at any time"), 2001, 
 やすみりえのトキメキ川柳, 2005, 
 ハッピーエンドにさせてくれない神様ね 2006,

External links 
  

1972 births
Living people
People from Kobe
Japanese women poets
21st-century Japanese poets
21st-century Japanese women writers
21st-century Japanese writers